All Saints' Church, Norwich is a Grade I listed redundant parish church in the Church of England in Norwich.

History
The church was largely built in the 15th century, when the nave and north aisle were added, but the chancel dates back to the 13th century. The un-buttressed tower was also built in the 15th century but had extensive repair work done in the 19th century, with the top stage of the tower being added in 1913.  

There is an anchorhold attached to the church that served religious hermits who chose to live their life separate from secular society. The city records from 1287 to 1288 show that servants of the anchoress were charged with ‘stopping up the Cockey (blocked the common drain) so that no one can pass by there’. It has been suggested that this was done in an attempt to cover up that either the anchoress or her servants were engaged in trade, something that was forbidden for any anchoress. 

It used to house a spectacular ornate font that featured carvings of saints arranged around the bowl and base. This was moved to St Julians Church (Norwich) following All Saints' being made redundant in the parochial reorganisation in 1973.

Post redundancy 
On being made redundant in 1973, Norwich Historic Churches Trust took it over and immediately spent £8000 on making it watertight. From 1979 it housed the All Saints Centre, a community centre set up by Jo Cook. It was used as a place to serve the community and to provide Christian hospitality for the less advantaged. The church was improved during this tenancy to include a commercial standard kitchen and a first-floor room in the aisle. This was originally designed to house the Diocesan Mothers' Union, who moved out in 2003.

The church faced an arson attack in 1992, following which there was a large cleaning and redecoration.

The All Saints Centre closed in 2015, when it was reopened as an antiques centre and tea room; All Saints Antiques Centre.  these tenants are still occupying the building.

A gallery was installed at the base of the tower to provide a platform for bell ringers to practice. The Norwich Diocesan Association of Ringers use this as one of their churches on the first Tuesday of every month.

Organ
The church contained an organ dating from 1861 by Corps. A specification of the organ can be found on the National Pipe Organ Register.

References

All Saints
15th-century church buildings in England
Grade I listed churches in Norfolk